Power's Brewery now CUB brewery, is a brewery based at Yatala in South East Queensland, Australia. It started out as an upstart brewery headed by publican Bernie Power to compete against the major Queensland brewery Castlemaine Perkins, in particular XXXX, during the Australian beer wars of the late 1980s.  When  mogul Alan Bond took over XXXX, Power's commenced operations in 1988. Castlemaine Perkins changed their terms of credit to hoteliers from one month to one week in late 1985. Power then became determined to brew his own brand (Brews News, 5 Jun 2015). He head hunted a number of young brewers from various brands.

Power's sponsored the Brisbane Broncos and Cronulla Sharks NSWRL teams.  By 1991/2 Power's had claimed roughly 14% of Queensland's beer market until being bought out by Foster's Group CUB brewery. In 1992 Power's entered into a joint operation with CUB. As Bernie Power claimed later the brewery was close to closure when CUB stepped in. He sold out to CUB in 1993. The entire length of Yatala Rd was owned by Power's, and the site was approved for brewing. CUB then set about building the largest brewery in the country. The original beers were Power's Bitter, Power's Gold and Power's Dry. The replacement facility now produces all of the CUB beers consumed outside of Victoria.

The story of Power's Brewery can now be found on Liquid wit-Power's Bitter advertising campaign.  Other mentions of the beer can be found on the Foster's lager page and Australian beer page.

The Power Brewing sponsored Brisbane Broncos, won the 1992 NSWRL Grand Final, the telecast rights had been secured in March 1992 by Andrew Cole (AKA Adman Andy) using a strategy and tactics that saw long time telecast holder XXXX Castlemaine Brewer lose those telecast rights on the 9 Network, the official broadcaster of the NSWRL in Australia. The sponsorship of the NSWRL gave Power Brewing the necessary coverage to their target market that in part lead to the increase in their market share of the Queensland beer market.

See also

Australian pub
Beer in Australia
List of breweries in Australia
1992 NRL Grand Final

References

Australian companies established in 1988
Food and drink companies established in 1988
Australian beer brands
Companies based on the Gold Coast, Queensland
Beer brewing companies based in Queensland
Buildings and structures on the Gold Coast, Queensland
Tourist attractions on the Gold Coast, Queensland
Foster's Group